Jagroop Singh Gill is an Indian politician and the MLA representing the Bathinda Urban Assembly constituency in the Punjab Legislative Assembly. He is a member of the Aam Aadmi Party. He was elected as the MLA in the 2022 Punjab Legislative Assembly election.

Career
He has served as municipal councillor for seven terms contesting on Congress ticket.

Member of Legislative Assembly
He was elected as the MLA in the 2022 Punjab Legislative Assembly election.  He represented the Bathinda Urban Assembly constituency in the Punjab Legislative Assembly. The Aam Aadmi Party gained a strong 79% majority in the sixteenth Punjab Legislative Assembly by winning 92 out of 117 seats in the 2022 Punjab Legislative Assembly election. MP Bhagwant Mann was sworn in as Chief Minister on 16 March 2022.

As an elected MLA Gill was entitled to have security cover and an official government vehicle, an Innova car. When he received a call about these, he declined to take the car or security cover. Gill had stated, "I am against VIP culture. I had written a letter requesting not to provide security, but the local police sent a few security personnel. But I don’t take them along. I will again ask them to take back the security personnel. I am a common man and don't need security". The Tribune reported that Gill is seen moving in his Wagon R car without security detail.

Committee assignments of Punjab Legislative Assembly
Chairman (2022–23) Committee on Local Bodies

Electoral performance

References 

Living people
Punjab, India MLAs 2022–2027
Aam Aadmi Party politicians from Punjab, India
Year of birth missing (living people)